Canebrake is an unincorporated community located in McDowell County, West Virginia, United States. Canbrake was named for the wild canes near the original town site. It has also been spelled Canebreak in its past.

References 

Unincorporated communities in McDowell County, West Virginia
Unincorporated communities in West Virginia